Donald MacKillop (Gaelic: Dòmhnall MacPhilip) (15 January 1926 - 26 August 2015) was a Scottish songwriter and poet who worked mainly in Scottish Gaelic.

Life and career

Early life 
Donald MacKillop was born on the island of Berneray, North Uist and attended Berneray school until the age of 14. In 1941 he spent seven months as a shepherd on the island of Pabbay, Harris, which at that time was deserted except for three shepherds. This was a formative experience and he wrote a number of poems about the island. After working on Pabbay he moved to Fort William with his family and worked at the aluminium smelter in Corpach.

Career 
In 1950, MacKillop joined the Strathclyde Police force where he worked for 25 years in the Maryhill division.

Works 
He is best known for "Coille an Fhàsaich" (The Wilderness Wood), a song that won the new song competition at the Pan Celtic Festival in Killearney in 1975. Another song, "Dualchas" (Heredity), was selected as the Scottish entrant in the festival in 1976. The song "Rosan" (Roses), written for his first wife, is sung by Anne Lorne Gillies on the album Gaelic Women.

Themes 
Depopulated communities feature throughout MacKillop's work. "Coille an Fhàsaich", written from the point of view of his first wife, who was from the island of Skye, describes a deserted landscape marked by ruined houses. The poem "Tilleadh a Hirt" (Returning to St. Kilda) tells of a St. Kildan returning to a cleared island post-evacuation, and another poem, "Eilean Phabaigh" (Island of Pabbay) portrays an island where the people "went not of their own free will".

References 

Scottish Gaelic language
20th-century Scottish Gaelic poets
1926 births
2015 deaths
People from Uist
Scottish sailors
20th-century Scottish poets
21st-century Scottish poets
21st-century British male writers
Scottish male poets
Royal Navy personnel of World War II
20th-century British male writers